The Iraqi Military Academy Rustamiyah (formerly Camp Rustamiyah, Camp Muleskinner or Camp Cuervo) is the site of the Iraqi military academy. It was previously a forward operating base for the U.S. Army in Iraq. Before 2003 it had been the site of the oldest military academy in Iraq.

History

British forces founded the Iraqi Military Academy at Rustamiyah in 1924 to train officers for the newly established Royal Iraqi Army, and based it on the Royal Military Academy in Sandhurst, England. The first class of Iraqi officers graduated in 1927.

Camp Rustamiyah was captured by the United States during the Iraq War. 

The academy was re-opened under NATO direction in 2005/06.

In 2009, the United States transferred control of Camp Rustamiyah back to the Iraqi security forces.

Location
Rustamiyah is located 6 miles (9.5 km) southeast of Sadr City in Baghdad. It is situated between a waste incineration facility and a sewage treatment plant, and is noted for its unpleasant and purportedly hazardous air quality. Also known for being the only location hit successfully multiple times with "lob bombs".

See also
Rasheed Airbase
List of United States military installations in Iraq

References

External links
Camp Rustamiyah at GlobalSecurity.org

Military installations of Iraq